Hungary has submitted films for the Academy Award for Best International Feature Film every year since 1965, a streak beaten only by France, which has submitted every year since 1956 (the first year the award was a competitive category rather than a Special Award).

Best International Feature Film (until 2019, Best Foreign Language Film) is one of 23 Oscar categories awarded annually by the Academy of Motion Picture Arts and Sciences to a feature-length film produced outside the United States that contains primarily (>50%) non-English dialogue. Hungary's submission is selected annually by a Selection Committee of esteemed film professionals.

Hungary has been nominated ten times, with István Szabó's Mephisto the first to win, followed by Son of Saul in 2015.

István Szabó's films were selected to represent Hungary seven times between 1967 and 1992, more than any other Hungarian director. Four of these were nominated, including one win. Zoltán Fábri's films were selected four times between 1965 and 1978, and nominated twice.

Submissions
Every year, each country is invited by the Academy of Motion Picture Arts and Sciences to submit its best film for the Academy Award for Best Foreign Language Film. The Foreign  Language Film Award Committee oversees the process and reviews all the submitted films. Following this, they vote via secret ballot to determine the five nominees for the award. Below is a list of the films that have been submitted by Hungary for review by the Academy for the award.

Almost all films were primarily in Magyar (also known as Hungarian), although three of Istvan Szabo's films- Colonel Redl, Hanussen and Mephisto- all of which starred Austrian actor Klaus Maria Brandauer, were largely in German.

See also
List of Academy Award winners and nominees for Best Foreign Language Film
List of Academy Award-winning foreign language films
Cinema of Hungary

Notes

References

External links
The Official Academy Awards Database
The Motion Picture Credits Database
IMDb Academy Awards Page

Hungary
Academy Award for Best Foreign Language Film